Zoltan Czaka (2 December 1932 – 12 November 2013) was a Romanian ice hockey player. He competed in the men's tournaments at the 1964 Winter Olympics and the 1968 Winter Olympics.

References

1932 births
2013 deaths
Olympic ice hockey players of Romania
Ice hockey players at the 1964 Winter Olympics
Ice hockey players at the 1968 Winter Olympics
Sportspeople from Miercurea Ciuc